From Here to Eternally is a 1979 studio album from Philly soul vocal group The Spinners, released on Atlantic Records. This album represents their last collaboration with producer Thom Bell and marks a decline in the critical and commercial success of the group.

Recording and release
The Spinners had a series of certified gold albums produced by Thom Bell for Atlantic Records in the 1970s.  By 1977, vocalist Philippé Wynne had left the group for a solo career and to work in the music business, leading to a commercial decline for the group and a pair of less successful albums in 1977, followed by a greatest hits album to buoy their profile. After this album and a few songs on the soundtrack to Bell's film The Fish That Saved Pittsburgh, the group changed their sound to disco and enlisted a different producer for Dancin' and Lovin' later in 1979.

Reception
The editors of AllMusic Guide scored this album three out of five stars, with reviewer Jason Elias opining that this album recovered some quality from their past two studio releases, noting that while it was a commercial failure, "it features a few underrated gems and some good to great production". "If You Wanna Do a Dance (All Night)" was a pick of the week in Billboard, noting that "this is a new direction" for the group with "perfect timing" and noting that they started experimenting with disco on this track. Upon the album release, From Here to Eternally was also spotlit as an album pick, noting that the group's smooth vocals and signature sound are apparent, augmented by Bell's production and collaboration with LeRoy Bell and Casey James.

Track listing
"It's a Natural Affair" (Thom Bell and Tony Bell) – 4:02
"Don't Let the Man Get You" (Casey James and LeRoy M. Bell) – 5:10
"(A) Plain and Simple Love Song" (Frank Hooker and Vinnie Barrett) – 5:21
"Are You Ready for Love" (Casey James, LeRoy M. Bell, and Thom Bell) – 5:20
"I Love the Music" (Casey James and LeRoy M. Bell) – 5:22
"One Man Wonderful Band" (James "Boogaloo" Bolden and Jack Robinson) – 3:04
"If You Wanna Do a Dance (All Night)" (Casey James, LeRoy M. Bell, and Thom Bell) – 7:05
"Once You Fall in Love" (Joseph B. Jefferson and Charles Simmons) – 4:23

Personnel

The Spinners
John Edwards
Henry Fambrough
Billy Henderson
Pervis Jackson
Bobby Smith
Additional musicians (see MFSB)
Bob Babbitt – bass guitar
LeRoy M. Bell – guitar
Anthony S. Bell – guitar, arrangement on "It's a Natural Affair", "Are You Ready for Love", "One Man Wonderful Band" and "If You Wanna Do A Dance (All Night)"
Thom Bell – keyboards, synthesizer, arrangement on all tracks except "One Man Wonderful Band" and "If You Wanna Do A Dance (All Night)", conducting, production
Charles Collins – drums, synth drums
Bobby Eli – guitar
Tim Gorman – synthesizer
Casey James – guitar
Larry Washington – percussion
Technical personnel
Michael Guinn – production assistance
Stephen Marchesi – cover illustration
Don Murray – chief engineering
Eric Porter – art direction
Buzz Richmond – assistant engineering
John Rosenthal – assistant engineering
Jeffery Stewart – assistant engineering
Wally Traugott – mastering at Capitol Mastering
Linda Tyler – assistant engineering

This album was mixed at Producers Workshop, Hollywood, California, United States.

Chart performance
From Here to Eternally was the least commercially successful Spinners album in almost a decade, reaching only 61st place on the R&B chart and peaking at 165 on the Billboard 200.

See also
List of 1979 albums

References

External links

1979 albums
Albums produced by Thom Bell
Atlantic Records albums
The Spinners (American group) albums